The Saginaw Valley Naval Ship Museum is dedicated to documenting the history of the United States Navy. The museum is permanently housed in the USS Edson, a retired United States Navy destroyer that has recently been converted to a museum. The museum is located in Bay City, Michigan, United States. The man responsible for this destroyer being opened for a museum is Mike Kegley, the president of the Saginaw Valley Naval Ship Museum, who has worked on the project for the last fifteen years. This destroyer will be the main event for the museum as it has plans to expand into other exhibits in the years to come. The vice president Richard Janke, the Secretary Mary Kegley, and the treasurer Mark Janke also run the museum.

History

Ship's background 
The retired US Naval warship the USS Edson was put into commission on November 7, 1958. The destroyer remained in commission for 30 years and was decommissioned on December 15, 1988. The USS Edson was built by Bath Iron Works in Bath, Maine, and then named after Major General Merritt Austin Edson. The ship was manned by 17 officers and 276 crew members. During its commission, it fired the most five-inch shells of any destroyer. This "fire first, ask questions later" policy earned the USS Edson the motto of “Three Guns, No Waiting”. The ship is a destroyer powered by four  boilers feeding by two steam turbines, driving a ship  in length. Though this ship is known greatly for its forceful firing, it had only seen time in two major wars. The USS Edson was a part of both the Vietnam War and the Cold War.

Ship's journey 
The United States Navy cleared the USS Edson on April 24, 2012, to become a part of the Saginaw Valley Naval Ship Museum. It took years for the museum to be approved to obtain a retired destroyer but Mike Kegly, President of the Saginaw Valley Naval Ship Museum, did not give up and continued to be persistent on being in touch with the Naval Offices. Since the ship was given approval to be a part of the museum, the museum had 50 days to come pick up the destroyer because it was the new owners' responsibility to obtain the ship after its release. The museum was forced to wait in order to obtain a quote on how much it would cost them to get two tug boats to aid in the delivery of the USS Edson from the Philadelphia Naval Shipyard to the museum located in Bangor Township. However, there was one major issue that faced the museum before they could take destroyer from its home in Philadelphia and that was with the boat's propeller guards. The propeller guards are featured on every ship to protect tug boats from running into the ships' propellers. This concern about the propellers became a problem for the USS Edson when it was passing through the locks near Canada because the Canadian Authorities were concerned that the guards could damage the locks as the ship passed through. After a long discussion and explanation on why the propeller guards had to stay Canadian Authorities cleared the destroyer to continue on with its voyage. Its permanent location within Bay City is at the Independence Park Boat Launch right next to the Independence Bridge located in Bangor Township.

Location 
The Saginaw Valley Naval Ship Museum is located in Bangor Township, and is open to everyone who wants to partake in the activities that the museum provides. The ship was released to the museum on April 24 and left for Bay City on July 18. It was expected that the ship would arrive, to its location on the Saginaw River on August 3, 2012 but some intense winds delayed the arrival until August 5. The USS Edson will be docked permanently as a floating museum and will be open for tours once the testing that the Environmental Protection Agency mandates is complete. The USS Edson will be the centerpiece for the Saginaw Valley Naval Ship Museum as it is located in the Saginaw River. The entire process  cost a total of an estimated $1.4 million. This is broken up into two major groups, the $750,000 it cost for the museum to buy the USS Edson from the Navy, and the remaining cost comes from the tug boats and the fuel for the two tug boats to transport the destroyer to its new home.

Volunteers 
The Saginaw Valley Naval Ship Museum was able to obtain this Navy destroyer because of the vast amount of volunteer work put in by the board members and many outside volunteers as well. A permanent dock was built for the museum. About  of paint in two different shades of gray were ordered for the painting of the dock. While waiting to obtain the last of the additional paint that is needed to completely repaint and restore the USS Edson color, the museum received word that those who are on the Navy's delayed entry program and are waiting to be shipped off to boot camp are willing to volunteer in the restoration of the destroyer.

References 

Museums in Bay County, Michigan
Bay City, Michigan
Military and war museums in Michigan
History museums in Michigan
Naval museums in the United States
Museums established in 2012
2012 establishments in Michigan
Saginaw River